Edward Chester Glover (March 1, 1885 – October 31, 1940) was an American athlete who competed mainly in the pole vault.

He competed for the United States in the 1906 Intercalated Games held in Athens, Greece in the Pole Vault where he won the bronze medal.

References

1885 births
1940 deaths
American male pole vaulters
Olympic bronze medalists for the United States in track and field
Medalists at the 1906 Intercalated Games
Athletes (track and field) at the 1906 Intercalated Games